Rune Hermans (born 9 May 1999) is a Belgian artistic gymnast. She competed at the 2015 World Artistic Gymnastics Championships and qualified to the individual all-around final, as well as the 2016 Summer Olympic Games.

References

1999 births
Living people
Belgian female artistic gymnasts
Sportspeople from Leuven
Gymnasts at the 2016 Summer Olympics
Olympic gymnasts of Belgium
Belgian women gymnasts